Fukrey Returns is a 2017 Indian Hindi-language comedy film directed by Mrighdeep Singh Lamba and produced by Farhan Akhtar and Ritesh Sidhwani. The film stars Pulkit Samrat, Manjot Singh, Ali Fazal, Varun Sharma, Priya Anand, Vishakha Singh, Pankaj Tripathi, Rajiv Gupta and Richa Chadda. A sequel to Fukrey (2013), it was released on 8 December 2017.

Plot 

After their admission into college, life in Delhi is enjoyed by Vikas Gulati/Hunny (Pulkit Samrat), Dilip Singh/Choocha (Varun Sharma), Lali (Manjot Singh), and Zafar (Ali Fazal). Hunny and Zafar are dating Priya (Priya Anand) and Neetu (Vishakha Singh) respectively, planning to marry them. 

Bholi Punjaban (Richa Chaddha) is released from jail after 12 months. She sends her henchmen to fetch the quartet. The four are brought to her place along with their acquaintance Panditji (Pankaj Tripathi). She asks them about their plan to fool her. As the boys convince her, she gives them one chance and invests some money to open a Lottery Shop. 

People are given numbers to which they invest some money. Choocha begins to distribute leaflets around the city and more people invest. Meanwhile, Minister Babulal Bhatia (Rajeev Gupta) who belongs to Janta Vikas Party, argues with the CM over the next election and bets him to win. The police around the city conduct raids on drugs and fake lottery shops. After finding out the quartet's shop, Babulal uses his power to change the lottery number and everyone who invested money is angered. The people gather around to beat them but they escape by jumping off a flyover in the river. They regain consciousness at a construction area and are spotted by Panditji. 

It is here that Choocha discovers he can see the future. He sees a tiger in his dream which later attacks them. The group is later caught by Bholi who is angered due to their foolishness, and orders to kill them. But Choocha's ability impresses her and she forgives them. The next day, Bholi asks them to find a treasure to which they agree if she releases them. Babulal fears that people will recover their money so he invites the boys to his residence. Panditji is sent in disguise to keep an eye on them. At dinner, the boys are forced to take an oath to help Babulal for their welfare in return. The next day, the boys take the blame instead of Babulal who misused people's money while Bholi goes to the CM to hand some factory papers related to Babulal and after the boys leave, police arrives and captures Babulal. The boys return home and see the disappointment in their loved ones. They decide to scheme up to earn more money. The next day, at Panditji's place, Choocha is forced to see a dream where Lali holds a tiger cub. 

Meanwhile, Babulal discovers Bholi's plan and ambushes her place. However, he forgives her murder on the pretext to find a treasure. To do so, Bholi calls Hunny for it who requests a tiger cub which she sold. The four friends and Bholi's guards return to the park where they are joined by Priya and Neetu. They dig a hole and enter a cave where they are spotted by the cub's mother. However, after escaping, they are led to a factory with huge stack of illegal goods. They find out the products to be worth  400 million. Babulal arrives at the place only to find out that the warehouse actually constains Babulal's trade inventory. He is angered and orders to banish them but police arrives on the scene. In a flashback, while estimating worth, Zafar called the police knowing Babulal bought this from China. Choocha proposes to Bholi to which she responds with a kiss, surprising everyone. Later, the four friends inaugurate an electronics shop with the products they found in the warehouse. The film ends with Hunny, Choocha, and Zafar respectively getting married to Priya, Bholi, and Neetu in Goa.

Cast 

 Pulkit Samrat as Vikas Gulati aka Hunny: Lali, Zafar and Choocha's best friend and Priya's husband 
 Manjot Singh as Lali Halwai: Billa's son and Hunny, Zafar and Choocha's best friend.
 Ali Fazal as Zafar Khan: Lali, Hunny and Choocha's best friend and Neetu's husband
 Varun Sharma as Dilip Singh aka Choocha: Hunny, Zafar and Lali's best friend and Bholi's husband.
 Priya Anand as Priya Sharma: Hunny's girlfriend turned wife.
 Vishakha Singh as Neetu Singh: Zafar's girlfriend turned wife
 Pankaj Tripathi as Panditji
 Rajiv Gupta as Minister Babulal Bhatia
 Richa Chaddha as Bholi Punjaban: a former gangster; Choocha's love interest turned wife.
 Nalneesh Neel as Mangu
 Sanjana Sanghi as Katty
 Pallavi Batra as Namita (hotel receptionist)
 Purnendu Bhattacharya as Brijmohan (Delhi Chief Minister)
 V S Prince Ratan as News Reporter
 Ishtiyak Khan as Tiddey
 Neelu Kohli as Choocha's mother
 Chitranjan Tripathi as Eunuch
 Shreekant Verma as Babulal P.A.
 Nataša Stanković in a special appearance in the song "Mehbooba"

Production 
On 30 January 2016, a sequel to Fukrey was announced, featuring the original cast, again directed by Lamba and produced by Excel Entertainment. Filming began in August 2016 in Delhi.

Soundtrack 

The music of the film is composed by Shaarib-Toshi, Sumeet Bellary, Prem-Hardeep, Jasleen Royal, Gulraj Singh, Shree D and Ishq Bector while the lyrics have been penned by Kumaar, Satya Khare, Aditya Sharma, Shree D, Mrighdeep Singh Lamba, Vipul Vig and Raftaar. The first track of the film titled as "Mehbooba" which is sung by Neha Kakkar, Yasser Desai, Mohammed Rafi and rapped by Raftaar was released on 15 November 2017. The soundtrack was released by Zee Music Company on 16 November 2017.

Critical reception 
The film met with mixed reviews from critics. Times of India gave it a rating of 3.5/5. Koimoi gave it a rating of 3.5/5 and wrote, "Retains the magic of the first part". Bollywood Hungama gave it a rating of 3 stars out of 5 and wrote, "Fukrey Returns begins on a great note but then turns silly and unconvincing becoming a fun, clean film that works despite the illogical and slightly unconvincing plot." Deccan Chronicle gave it a rating of 3 stars out of 5 and wrote, "Choocha's hilarious act saves this gritty comedy." Kriti Tulsiani of News18 gave the film a rating of 2 out of 5 and said that, "Watch Fukrey Returns if you like but don’t expect the spark of the original. Plus, the giggles are more like a reminder of the original Fukrey and nothing more." Rohit Vats of Hindustan Times gave the film a rating of 1.5 out of 5 saying that, "Blame it on the success of the original or the four-year-gap between the two films, Fukrey Returns isn’t even a patch on Fukrey. Fukrey Returns is a tedious 141-minute watch which is unfunny, unintelligent and repetitive." Namrata Joshi of The Hindu said that, "The novelty and freshness of sleeper hit ‘Fukrey’ wear down drastically in the sequel." Shubhra Gupta of The Indian Express gave the film a rating of 1.5 out of 5 and said that, "This Pulkit Samrat and Varun Sharma starrer is relentlessly juvenile. The situations are so tired and contrived there’s nothing that even such capable hands as Richa Chadha and Pankaj Tripathi can do, to retain our interest." Saibal Chatterjee of NDTV gave the film a rating of 2 out of 5 and said that, "Fukrey Returns comes nowhere near being the rip-roaring ride that the 2013 sleeper hit Fukrey. For a film that aspires to be a full-on laugh riot, Fukrey Returns is a bit of a trudge."

Rachit Gupta of Filmfare gave the film a rating of 2 out of 5 and said that, "Fukrey Returns is a sequel that wants to be bigger, better and funnier than the original. In all fairness, it does manage to fulfil its ambitions on two accounts. It is bigger, it is funnier but it's certainly not better." Uday Bhatia of LiveMint wasn't impressed with the movie and said that, "Fukrey was rooted in the everyday: the comedy seemed to arise naturally from the slackers’ surroundings. The sequel, though, has the desperation and unfocussed energy of a work that's not sure why it exists." Sukanya Verma of Rediff gave the film a rating of 2 out of 5 and said that Fukrey Returns is "a clumsily conceived sequel, a foolhardy endeavour to milk a fluke, an outright bore". Suhani Singh of India Today felt that the "film has little apart from Varun Sharma" and gave it a rating of 1.5 out of 5.

Sequel
A sequel titled Fukrey 3 releasing on 7 September 2023 with the cast of the previous two films minus Ali Fazal, reprising their roles and Mrighdeep Singh Lamba as the director.

References

External links 
 
 

2010s buddy films
2010s Hindi-language films
Films scored by Ishq Bector
Films scored by Sharib-Toshi
Films scored by Jasleen Royal
Indian buddy comedy films
2010s buddy comedy films
Films set in Delhi
2017 comedy films